A Flower of Evil is a 1961 South Korean horror film directed and produced by Lee Yong-min.

Plot
After many years of work, a scientist obsessed with revenge develops a flower that will do his bidding and drink human blood.

References

External links
 

1961 films
1960s Korean-language films
South Korean horror films
1961 horror films
Films about plants